A1 Team Portugal was the Portuguese team for A1 Grand Prix, an international racing series.

Management 

The A1 Team Portugal team owners were Luís Figo and Carlos Queiroz. The team's operations were run by CEO Luís Vicente, manager of the Fundação Luís Figo.

History

2008–09 season 
Driver: Filipe Albuquerque

Filipe Albuquerque will be the primary driver for A1 Team Portugal through to the end of the 2009–10 season. He scored his first A1GP victory in the feature race in China. With four additional podium finishes and only two races without points (both during the same event), Albuquerque went on to finish as 3rd in the 2008–09 championship, with 92 points.

2007–08 season 
Drivers: Filipe Albuquerque, João Urbano

After a dismal start to the season, scoring only five points in the first six races, Team Portugal came alive after Filipe Albuquerque became lead driver. The team scored three podiums, and finished 11th in the championship.

2006–07 season 
Drivers: Álvaro Parente, João Urbano

Team Portugal only competed in four rounds of the 2006–07 season, starting with the Durban race. They scored twice, and finished in 17th place in the championship.

2005–06 season 
Drivers: César Campaniço, Álvaro Parente

In the inaugural season, Team Portugal took 3 podiums en route to 9th in the championship.

FPAK A1GP Portugal Junior Team 
The Federação Portuguesa de Automobilismo e Karting (FPKA) and the A1 Team Portugal create in November 2007 the FPAK A1GP Portugal Junior Team to encourage Portuguese drivers into A1GP. This project, give to Portuguese Cup and Open Racing Series in Portugal drivers, the opportunities to take part in the rookie sessions or practice events. The first driver to benefit from this Junior Team is Gonçalo Araújo will take part in the rookie session at Zuhai during the fourth round of the 2007–08 season.
Except Gonçalo Araújo, Bruno Serra and Frederico Duarte will take part of Junior Team in 2007–08. This season, its Armando Parente, António Félix da Costa, Gonçalo Araújo and Bruno Serra.

Drivers

Complete A1 Grand Prix results 

(key), "spr" indicates the Sprint Race, "fea" indicates the Feature Race.

References

External links

A1gp.com Official A1 Grand Prix Web Site
Official Team Website - A1 Team Portugal

Portugal A1 team
Motorsport in Portugal
A1 team
Auto racing teams established in 2005
Auto racing teams disestablished in 2009